New Socialism may refer to:
 Neosocialism, a French political movement in the 1930s–40s
 Digital socialism, a form of socialism advocated in the 1993 book Towards a New Socialism
 Ideologies supported by various political parties and movements: 
 For a New Socialism, a Russian political movement
 Communist Party of the Russian Federation
 A Just Russia — For Truth
 A policy advocated in the 1973 book Economics and the Public Purpose